A listing of episodes of the TLC television program Little People, Big World.

Series overview

Episodes

Pilot (2006)

Season 1 (2006)

Season 2 (2006)

Season 3 (2007)

Season 4 (2007)

Season 5 (2008)

Season 6 (2008)

Season 7 (2009)

Season 8 (2009-10)

Season 9 (2010)

Season 10 (2010-12)

Season 11/Spin-Off: Wedding Farm (2012-13)

Season 12 (2013)

Season 13 (2014)

Season 14 (2015)

Season 15 (2016)

Season 16 (2016-17)

Season 17 (2017)

Season 18 (2018)

Season 19 (2019)

Season 20 (2020)

Season 21 (2020)

Season 22 (2021)

Season 23 (2022)

Season 24 (2022)

References 

Little People, Big World episodes